The UK Rock & Metal Singles Chart is a record chart which ranks the best-selling rock and heavy metal songs in the United Kingdom. Compiled and published by the Official Charts Company, the data is based on each track's weekly physical sales, digital downloads and streams. In 2007, there were 22 singles that topped the 52 published charts. The first number-one single of the year was "Different World", the second single from heavy metal band Iron Maiden's 14th studio album A Matter of Life and Death, which spent the first two weeks of the year atop the chart. The final number-one single of the year was "Long Road to Ruin", the second single from American alternative rock band Foo Fighters' sixth studio album Echoes, Silence, Patience & Grace, which spent the last three weeks of 2007 and the first of 2008 at number one.

The most successful song on the UK Rock & Metal Singles Chart in 2007 was "Famous Last Words" by My Chemical Romance, which spent six consecutive weeks at number one early in the year. "Anything Can Happen in the Next Half Hour" by Enter Shikari spent five weeks at number one, while Linkin Park spent a total of five weeks at number one across two releases – "What I've Done" (three weeks) and "Bleed It Out" (two weeks). "Walk Away" by Funeral for a Friend was number one for four weeks, while "Tarantula" by The Smashing Pumpkins, "The Kiss of Dawn" by HIM, "Empty Walls" by Serj Tankian and "Long Road to Ruin" by Foo Fighters were all number one for three weeks. Releases from Iron Maiden, Evanescence, Muse, Lostprophets, Queens of the Stone Age, Nightwish and Gallows each spent two weeks at number one.

Chart history

See also
2007 in British music
List of UK Rock & Metal Albums Chart number ones of 2007

References

External links
Official UK Rock & Metal Singles Chart Top 40 at the Official Charts Company
The Official UK Top 40 Rock Singles at BBC Radio 1

2007 in British music
United Kingdom Rock and Metal Singles
2007